Backhaul Adaptation Protocol (BAP) is a layer 2 Routing protocol used in 5G for Integrated Access and Backhaul (IAB)

.

This protocol is specified by 3GPP in TS 38.340.

The purpose of BAP is to deliver packets to a destination node over multiple hops. 
BAP is located on top of the 3GPP RLC-layer.

A BAP PDU is either a Data PDU or a Control PDU.

Data PDUs are used to transport upper layer data along a path towards a destination.
A BAP Data PDU has the following format:

 D/C bit to indicate if the PDU is BAP Control PDU (value 0) or a BAP Data PDU (value 1)
 3 Reserved bits 
 10 bits destination BAP address
 10 bits path id
 Data to be transported, e.g. an IP packet

Control PDUs are used to indicate backhaul radio link failures, to poll for flow control information 
and to provide flow control feedback. A BAP Control PDU has the following format:

 D/C bit to indicate if the PDU is BAP Control PDU (value 0) or a BAP Data PDU (value 1)
 4 bits PDU type 
 0000 = Flow control feedback per BH RLC channel
 0001 = Flow control feedback per routing ID
 0010 = Flow control feedback polling
 0011 = Backhaul Radio Link Failure (BH RLF) indication
 3 Reserved bits
Further information is dependent on PDU type.
For flow control feedback per BH RLC channel, available buffer size is given per BH RLC channel. 
For flow control feedback per routing ID, available buffer size is given per BAP routing ID (which consists of BAP address and path ID). 
No further information is given in the flow control feedback polling and the BH RLF indication.

References 

3GPP standards
5G (telecommunication)
Routing protocols